Raat Akeli Hai is a 2020 Indian Hindi-language thriller drama film directed by Honey Trehan. Starring Nawazuddin Siddiqui, Radhika Apte, Shweta Tripathi, Tigmanshu Dhulia, Shivani Raghuvanshi, Nishant Dahiya, Gyanendra Tripathi, Ila Arun, Swanand Kirkire, Nitesh Kumar Tiwari and Aditya Srivastava, the film follows a small-town cop who is summoned to investigate the death of an elderly family member. Raat Akeli Hai was released on Netflix on 31 July 2020. The film received critical acclaim for its performances and direction. Nawazuddin Siddiqui earned a Best Actor award at the Filmfare OTT Awards while the film also won Best Film at the ceremony.

Plot
The film starts with a car being followed by a truck. The truck hits the car and the car flips over. A man alights and brutally kills both the driver and the lady who were in the car. The killer then takes the bodies to a factory and burns them with acid. While doing so, he accidentally spills acid on one of his own hands.

Five years Later, Inspector Jatil Yadav is seen attending the wedding of his colleague Narendra Singh where Jatil's mother is desperately searching for a girl to set him up with for marriage. Jatil is irritated and embarrassed and rushes his mother home to avoid further interference in his personal life. While eating dinner, Jatil gets called by the SSP to investigate a high-profile murder of a rich aristocrat named Raghuveer Singh. Jatil learns that Raghuveer was murdered by his own gun on his wedding night and is further intrigued by the family's silence and lack of knowledge on the matter. Jatil Yadav is first introduced to the family by Ramesh Chauhan, brother of Raghuveer Singh's first wife (who was murdered 5 years ago). Members of Raghuveer's family include his two children - Karuna Singh (daughter of Raghuveer Singh) and Karan (son of Raghuveer Singh), Chunni (the maid of the house), Pramila Singh (wife of Raghuveer Singh's brother and Raghuveer Singh's sister-in-law), Vasudha and Vikram Singh (daughter and son of Pramila), Ravi Sisodia - the volatile husband of Karuna, and Radha - the young bride of Raghuveer Singh. Starting the interrogation, it is revealed to Jatil that Vikram was the first one to discover Raghuveer's dead body. As per Vikram's story, he went to drop off his fiancée (daughter of the notorious MLA Munna Raja) at around 9:30. He returned around 11:15 and then took the ladies of the house to a temple at 12:30.

It was after this that Vikram says that he found his uncle Raghuveer dead. He also says that there was baraat crossing in-front of the house at 10:30. Jatil eventually finds out about back stairs which connects directly to a water tank and wonders if that route was used to carry out any suspicious business. During Jatil's investigation, he begins to question Radha. Jatil develops a soft spot for her as something tells him that she is being made a scapegoat by Raghuveer's family. Radha is treated like an outsider by the family, who resents her. After first refusing to cooperate, Radha remembers something that connects her to Jatil and gives the chit to Chunni to pass to Jatil. On the chit, the address of Radha is written and he distinctly remembers that he had saved Radha five years earlier, when she attempted suicide by jumping off a train. This further leads him to believe that Radha is an innocent and emotionally disturbed girl who is getting caught in the crossfire of what seems to be developing into an insidious plot. Further into his investigation, Jatil finds out that Raghuveer's first wife was killed during a robbery when she was coming back from Gwalior towards Kanpur.

Jatil also learns that Raghuveer's son Karan had once been apprehended with drugs. Jatil realises that there's more to Raghuveer's complicated family than what meets the eye.

The next day, during the investigation, Jatil finds erotic magazines in Raghuveer's cupboard and some photos of women and a plastic bead below the bed. He also learns that Radha was sold by her father and one of the photos is of Radha with a bruised back which he found earlier. Radha continues to refrain from telling Jatil anything. Later, Munna Raja comes in after Ravi Sisodia calls him in response to Jatil's no-nonsense investigation style. While investigating the manor, Jatil also spots a senile older woman who was earlier the maid of house. The old maid's son was the driver when Raghuveer's first wife was returning from Gwalior to Kanpur and she is grandmother of Chunni. Jatil continues to investigate. Forensics tell Jatil that Raghuveer was murdered between 10pm and 12pm with his own gun and blunt marks were due to because he was hit by butt of the same gun.

Phone records reveal that Vikram received a phone call from his uncle at 11:30 and many phone calls from an unknown number which is identified as Radha's. No fingerprints were found on gun or on Raghuveer's phone. During an interrogation with Chunni, Jatil finds she was the one who took the lamp up to Raghuveer's room and came back with the lamp which broke down on the stairs. She also refrains from divulging anything related to the current investigation, but does say he couldn't even see her father who died in that road accident and case got closed. Jatil starts investigating the death of Raghuveer's first wife and her driver. He finds that another city's police had reported a similar car and it was filed as hit and run case. This leads him to a tannery in Jajmau which is run by a butcher, but was originally owned by Munna Raja.

Further investigation into the family reveals that Karuna doesn't like her aunt and her cousin's interference since they are constantly eyeballing her. Later, Jatil finds a medical report and in the morning Chunni is found dead near the back stairs. He later fights with his colleague Narendra and openly tells the SSP that he will find the truth. Later he is attacked by the goons and calls Narendra for help, but Narendra ignores him and he tells him that he is going to arrest Radha. Jatil immediately warns Radha to run, but before she can run away Ravi chases her and she locks herself in a room. Jatil comes in time to take her away, but goons continue to chase them. They are able to catch a train though unknown to them one of the goons also catches the train. Later in the night Radha wakes up to see Jatil is missing. She takes her knife with her and finds Jatil being attacked by the Butcher working for Munna Raja. Both overpower the Butcher and throw him out of the train. Jatil and Radha reach Raghuveer's Gwalior farmhouse. During this time Narendra Singh is investigating the murder of Chunni and forensics tells him about the dead skin found in her fingernails leading him to the conclusion that the suspect is a man with burnt skin.

Narendra makes the report and goes to SSP, but he sees the man having fingernail marks on burnt hand in the office of SSP with Munna Raja. He goes to Chunni's grandmother and shows her the photo of the man. He informs him about all of this to Jatil, but in the meantime he finds a dupatta in Radha's bag having the same bead he found earlier, he confronts her that she was in fact in the room and she lied, she confesses that she and Vikram had an affair and planned to elope with Vikram but he didn't as he planned to marry MLA's daughter, seeing this she got furious and called Vikram to come and talk, he returned as soon as he dropped his fiancée and parked the car and without anyone noticing took the back stairs and confronted Radha. As she was going to enter the room to tell Raghuveer about the affair, the lights went out and Chunni comes upstairs with the lamp. As the electricity comes back, they all find Raghuveer already dead. Vikram tells her to go downstairs and meanwhile Vikram tells Chunni to call on his cell from Raghuveer's phone.

After this, while returning Chunni drops the lamp on the stairs. Vikram takes the backstairs and returns by the main gate and asks the women to come to go for the temple. Later Jatil informs SSP that he has made Radha surrender in another police station.

Jatil opens the medical report and finds the medical report under the name of Raghuveer's first wife and report was of abortion, and abortion was done one day before the accident. He enquires about it from her brother Ramesh who tells him that she was here with him as Karan caught malaria but left all of a sudden to Kanpur but when he asked on the phone, he told he heard horns of the train but contradicting to this she was travelling by car. He also enquired the caretaker of the farmhouse who told that she ordered him to call whenever Raghuveer came with another woman. Investigating the farmhouse, he finds the same erotic magazines, Polaroid photos, Polaroid camera and a badge of a boarding school. He visits the abortion clinic as well and watches the wedding video, too. He learns that Radha is being taken by police under the bridge on the orders of SSP. As Radha is being taken by Narendra Singh under the bridge the same van comes who were chasing Jatil with the butcher in it, he comes out and inspect the van as he opens the van to take out Radha, Jatil who all along was accompanying her come out and attack resulting in cross-firing in which Radha gets injured but butcher escapes, as soon as butcher reaches his home Chunni's grandmother comes from back and throws oil onto him and burns him alive.

In the climax, Radha comes with Jatil in the bungalow with everyone present he starts to tell the truth, He confronts Ravi Sisodia first that he is one who gave drugs to Karan and later the school caught him and Raghuveer bailed him out. It was in fact the butcher who killed both Raghuveer's first wife and driver and burnt the bodies in the tannery on the orders of Munna Raja. Mrs. Raghuveer was tipped off by the caretaker about a female whom Raghuveer brought in the farmhouse. On peeping through a window, Mrs. Raghuveer finds out the woman is none other than Vasudha, Pramila's daughter. Vasudha was sexually abused many times by her uncle Raghuveer who took perverse photos of her and raped her. As a result of Vasudha's abortion, she was expelled from school. On 16th Chunni filed a missing report for her father (the driver who was murdered with Mrs. Raghuveer during their fateful car ride back from Kanpur). The case got closed without due investigation.

It is revealed that Vasudha killed her uncle because when she confronted him with the truth, he dismissed her claims and insulted her and asked her to kill herself. In a fit of rage, Vasudha she takes out his gun and shoot him point blank. Later, Vasudha takes out her dupatta and puts it in the Radha's bag. The change of dupatta is noticed by Jatil in the wedding video while he is surveying the footage for clues. It is also revealed that Mrs Raghuveer had called Pramila to tell her about the fact that her daughter Vasudha was being sexually abused by her husband Raghuveer. After the truth is shared with Pramila, she is shocked but uses the opportunity to bury the truth. Mrs. Raghuveer was originally going to go back to her brother's home but Pramila begs her to come to back Kanpur. Meanwhile, Pramila reaches out in desperation to Munna Raja (the local MLA and friend of the family) and hints at killing Mrs. Raghuveer who in on route back to Kanpur. She is afraid that Mrs. Raghuveer will take them out of their property to avoid any controversy. Pramila uses the opportunity to broker a deal with Raghuveer to get a lion's share of the property transferred on her son Vikram's name so that she is paid for her efforts while nurturing the family. Munna Raja is revealed to have bought Radha from his father for Raghuveer to placate his sexual desires. After being confronted with the truth, her son Vikram shuns her in disgust. Karuna cries in disbelief. Karan watches. Vasudha is teary eyed and in shock that her mother tried to save her perpetrator. Pramila kills herself to save face. During Pramila's cremation, Vasudha tells Jatil the truth.

Jatil goes back to his normal life with his mother who is intent on finding a suitable match for him. He catches up with Radha's train and subtly asks her to spend her life with him, which she shyly accepts.

Cast
 Nawazuddin Siddiqui as Inspector Jatil Yadav
 Radhika Apte as Radha
 Shweta Tripathi as Karuna Singh
 Gyanendra Tripathi as Ravi Sisodia
 Tigmanshu Dhulia as Senior SP Lalji Shukla IPS
 Shivani Raghuvanshi as Vasudha Singh
 Aditya Srivastava as M.L.A. Munna Raja
 Nishant Dahiya as Vikram Singh
 Padmavati Rao as Pramila Singh
 Ila Arun as Sarita Kumari, Jatil's mother
 Swanand Kirkire as Ramesh Chauhan
 Shree Dhar Dubey as Narendra Singh/ Nandu
 Ravi Sah as Truck Driver / Keval
 Khalid Tyabji as Raghuveer Singh
 Riya Shukla as Chunni

Production
The film was shot mostly in Lucknow and Kanpur of Uttar Pradesh on real locations. In Kanpur the unit shot in Jajmau, Kotwali and Bithoor while in Lucknow it was shot in Qaiserbagh police station, bus stand and Malihabad.

Reception
Saibal Chatterjee of NDTV gave four stars out of five and said, "The film does to the crime and punishment genre what Bulbbul did to the supernatural revenge fantasy - lifts it many notches above the ordinary." Shubhra Gupta of The Indian Express gave three stars out of five and said, "A few of the bits and pieces in Netflix's Raat Akeli Hai feel a bit contrived, but not enough to take the enjoyment away from a film which has a terrific sense of time and place, and a crime in which everyone has stakes." Komal Nahta of Film Information said, "It's a well-made and well-enacted whodunit. However, the last about half an hour seems rather implausible and, therefore, is not as exciting as it should’ve been." Rohan Naahar of Hindustan Times said, "Raat Akeli Hai is quite the achievement. Trehan not only has a skill for directing actors, but also displays a command over tone and visual texture."

Soundtrack 

The music for the film was composed by Sneha Khanwalkar while the lyrics written by Raj Shekhar and Swanand Kirkire.

References

External links
 
 

2020 films
Hindi-language Netflix original films
Indian direct-to-video films
Indian crime thriller films
Films scored by Sneha Khanwalkar